Wang Yuchen (born June 15, 2005) is a Chinese pair skater. With her skating partner, Huang Yihang, she is the 2020 Cup of China silver medalist, the 2020 Chinese junior national champion, and placed in the top eight at the 2020 World Junior Championships.

Personal life 
Wang was born on June 15, 2005 in Changchun, Jilin.

Career

Early career 
Wang started skating in 2011. Her first pairs coach was Luan Bo.

Wang teamed up with Huang Yihang prior to the 2017–18 season. They placed eighth at the 2018 Chinese Championships, where there was no separate junior division.

2018–2019 season 
Wang/Huang were added to the Chinese national team ahead of the season to replace an injured Yu Xiaoyu / Zhang Hao. They made their junior international debut on the Junior Grand Prix, placing eighth in Canada and 13th in the Czech Republic. In early December, Wang/Huang competed at the Russian-Chinese Winter Youth Games, where they finished fourth. They ended their season at the 2019 Chinese Championships at the end of the month. As there was no separate junior division, Wang/Huang finished fifth among seniors.

2019–2020 season 

Wang/Huang opened their season on the Junior Grand Prix and finished eighth at both their events in the United States and Croatia. In between the two JGP events, they competed at the 2020 Chinese Championships, where they won the junior title by 0.01 points ahead of Wang Huidi / Jia Ziqi and Li Jiaen / Wang Zijian.

Wang/Huang were assigned to compete at the 2020 Winter Youth Olympics in Lausanne, Switzerland in January. On being selected, Wang said: "I am very excited to participate in such a large competition for the first time. In order to achieve our competition goal, I will train hard and strive to skate in my best form and win glory for the country." Wang/Huang went on to place fifth in the individual event. Huang expressed dissatisfaction with their performance and called it a "learning opportunity." As part of Team Future during the team event, they again placed fifth to help the team finish seventh overall.

Wang/Huang finished their season at the 2020 World Junior Championships in March. Placing eighth in the short program and sixth in the free skating, they ended in eighth place overall.

2020–2021 season 
Due to the COVID-19 pandemic, the Junior Grand Prix series was cancelled and the Grand Prix events were limited to domestic competitors or skaters who trained in the host nation's immediate geographic region. As a result, Wang/Huang were assigned to make their senior debut at the 2020 Cup of China. They finished second in both segments to earn the silver medal behind Peng Cheng / Jin Yang.

In January 2021, Wang/Huang participated in the New Year's Day Ice Carnival, a domestic team competition held among the Chinese national team, as part of Sui Wenjing's Team Elite alongside Jin Boyang, Chen Hongyi, Wang Yihan, and Chen Hong / Sun Zhuoming. They lost the competition to Han Cong's Team Sharp Blades after falling behind on the first day of competition.

2021–2022 season 
Wang/Huang were assigned to compete at the 2021 CS Nebelhorn Trophy to attempt to qualify a third berth for Chinese pairs at the 2022 Winter Olympics. They placed fourth in the short program, third among the teams seeking the three available spots, but dropped to sixth place after three falls in their free skate, and did not qualify a place.

Programs 
 With Huang

Competitive highlights 
GP: Grand Prix; JGP: Junior Grand Prix

 With Huang

Detailed results 
 With Huang

Senior results

Junior results

References

External links 

 

2005 births
Living people
Chinese female pair skaters
Figure skaters from Changchun
Figure skaters at the 2020 Winter Youth Olympics